The Play-offs of the 2012 Fed Cup Asia/Oceania Zone Group I were the final stages of the Group I Zonal Competition involving teams from Asia and Oceania. Using the positions determined in their pools, the seven teams faced off to determine their placing in the 2012 Fed Cup Asia/Oceania Zone Group I. The top team advanced to the World Group II, and the bottom team was relegated down to the Group II for the next year.

Promotion play-offs
The first placed teams of each pool were drawn in a head-to-head round. The winner of the round advanced to the World Group II play-offs, where they'd get a chance to advanced to World Group II.

China vs. Kazakhstan

3rd to 4th play-offs
The second placed teams of each pool were drawn in head-to-head rounds to find the third and fourth placed teams.

Chinese Taipei vs. Thailand

Relegation play-offs
The last placed teams of each pool were drawn in a head-to-head round. The loser of each round was relegated down to Asia/Oceania Zone Group II in 2012.

Uzbekistan vs. Indonesia

Final Placements

  advanced to the World Group II play-offs, and were drawn against . They lost 1–4, and thus was relegated back to Group I for 2011.
  was relegated down to 2013 Fed Cup Asia/Oceania Zone Group II.

See also
Fed Cup structure

References

External links
 Fed Cup website

2012 Fed Cup Asia/Oceania Zone